Ribonuclease F (ribonuclease F (E. coli)) is an enzyme. This enzyme catalyses the following chemical reaction

 Endonucleolytic cleavage of RNA precursor into two, leaving 5'-hydroxy and 3'-phosphate groups

References

External links 

EC 3.1.27